The Winifred Holtby Memorial Prize was presented from 1967 until 2003 by the Royal Society of Literature for the best regional novel of the year.  It is named after the novelist Winifred Holtby who was noted for her novels set in the rural scenes of her childhood.
In 2003 it was superseded by the Ondaatje Prize.

References

Royal Society of Literature awards
Awards established in 1967
1967 establishments in the United Kingdom
Awards disestablished in 2003
2003 disestablishments in the United Kingdom
British fiction awards